Cerenopini is a tribe of darkling beetles in the family Tenebrionidae. There are at least two genera in Cerenopini, found in North America.

Genera
These genera belong to the tribe Cerenopini:
 Argoporis Horn, 1870
 Cerenopus Leconte, 1851

References

Further reading

 
 

Tenebrionoidea